José Eduardo Ortiz Flores (born 8 March 2000) is a Guatemalan racewalking athlete. He qualified to represent Guatemala at the 2020 Summer Olympics in Tokyo 2021, competing in men's 20 kilometres walk.

International Competitions

References

External links
 

2000 births
Living people
Guatemalan male racewalkers
Athletes (track and field) at the 2020 Summer Olympics
Olympic athletes of Guatemala
Sportspeople from Guatemala City
21st-century Guatemalan people